Lazybones or Lazy Bones may refer to:

Lazybones (song), a 1933 song by Johnny Mercer and Hoagy Carmichael
Lazybones (1935 film), a British film directed by Michael Powell
Lazybones (1925 film), a silent film directed by Frank Borzage
Lazy Bones, a British comic strip which ran from 1978-1990
Lazy Bones, a 1934 part-animation film by Fleischer Studios featuring Borrah Minevitch
"Lazy Bones", a 2012 song by Green Day from ¡Dos!